Subhash Marg is a road located in Lucknow, Uttar Pradesh in India, that travels through Pandariba, Naka Hindola, Raniganj, Pandeyganj and Rakabganj Chauraha.

School(s)
Navyug Girls Degree College

Places of interest

Naka Hindola electronics market
Raniganj Dharamshala
Rakabganj Chauraha
King George Medical College

References

Roads in Lucknow